Zhanneta Lazarevna Metallidi (1 June 1934 —  7 June 2019) was a Soviet and Russian composer and music educator.

Biography 
She was born in Leningrad, and studied with Galina Ustvol'skaya in Leningrad and with Orest Yevlakhov at the Leningrad Conservatory.

Ater completing her education, Metallidi worked at the Leningrad Drama Institute as an accompanist and began composing incidental music for plays. In 1960 she took a position teaching at a children's music school and began to compose in other genres.

Death
She died on June 7, 2019 in St. Petersburg at the age of 85.

Works
Metallidi composed for orchestra, chamber ensemble and chorus. She was noted for children's music. Selected works include:
 Songs of the Great Way for voice and piano, 1958 (Walt Whitman words)
 Romances, song cycle, 1973
Siuita, 1975
Smeyantsi, cantata for children's chorus, percussion, piano, 1981
  The Country, musical, 1989
 The Cockroach, opera, 1992

References

External links
 Библиография Ж. Л. Металлиди

1934 births
2019 deaths
20th-century classical composers
Russian music educators
Women classical composers
Russian classical composers
Russian people of Greek descent
Women music educators
Soviet music educators
Soviet classical composers
Soviet people of Greek descent
Musicians from Saint Petersburg
Saint Petersburg Conservatory alumni
20th-century women composers
20th-century women educators